NO Vouliagmeni or "NOV" (Greek: Ναυτικός Όμιλος Βουλιαγμένης, "NOB" = Nautical Club of Vouliagmeni) is a major aquatic sports club, founded by local sportsmen in 1937 in the seaside resort of Vouliagmeni, Athens, Greece. The club is located on the eastern edge of the Mikro Kavouri peninsula, adjacent to the Astir Palace Hotel and overlooking the bay, town and lake of Vouliagmeni.

The club also takes particular pride in being an "extended family" for all its past and present athletes. Almost all its coaches and sports staff are past club athletes, and members are encouraged to involve their children in club sports from the youngest age possible.

Activities 
The club admits members and their guests and operates a marina, a waterskiing school, junior and Olympic competition sailing boats and facilities, an open-air, heated swimming pool, two rocky beaches, members' indoor and outdoor lounges, reading and conference rooms, a first-aid station, a gym, and an upscale restaurant.  The club publishes a quarterly illustrated newsletter, the "Tríaina" (Τρίαινα, "Trident"), distributed free.  As part of the celebrations for the club's seventy years, a memorial volume, "In Search of the Sporting Ideal", was published in 2008, in commemoration of the club's history.  The volume chronicles the club's foundation and development, and pays particular tribute to the many club athletes who have taken part in Olympic Games and won Olympic medals.  The most notable Olympic athlete to have been fostered at the club is windsurfer Nikolaos Kaklamanakis (gold medal, Atlanta Olympics, 1996, and silver medal, Athens Olympics, 2004).

The outdoor, heated pool hosts swimming, finswimming, synchronized swimming and water polo teams and the respective training schools for children.  The club hosts two annual competition meetings for youngsters, the "Tzeláteia" swimming gala and the "Chatzitheodórou" water polo Cup, as well as annual water skiing and sailing events.  In addition to regular training for its young athletes, the club organises training schools for beginners, open to all children interested in swimming, finswimming, water polo, boat sailing, windsurfing, synchronized swimming, and waterskiing.  Four periods are offered per year in total, two (winter and spring) during school season and two more during the summer vacations.

Sports activities for members include aquarobics, aerobics, martial arts classes, long-distance sea swimming, water skiing, and Olympic and recreational sailing and windsurfing.  The club also provides mooring for recreational boats owned by members.  Several social events and functions are also held at the club, including concerts, art exhibitions, lectures, receptions, dinner parties, the Christmas Eve and New Year's Eve balls, the all-day "May Day at the Club" barbecue, and the midsummer "Full Moon Ball".

Crest and colours 
The club crest depicts a blue anchor set inside a white lifebuoy with eight red stripes; blue, white and red being the club colors.

Water polo 
The women's and men's water polo teams are a traditional force in European water polo and have won many Greek and several European Championships and Cups.  The club often hosts LEN Euroleague and LEN Cup tournaments, its star players consistently being capped for the Greek men's and women's national teams.

The women's team are the reigning Greek champions (2010) and also the reigning European champions for the second consecutive year (2009, 2010).  In 2009 they won the LEN Champions' Cup in Kirishi, Russia, defeating the Italian champions, Orizzonte Catania, in the final.  In 2010 they won the LEN Champions' Cup in Corfu, Greece, defeating the Russian champions, Kinef Kirishi, in the final.

In addition to the men's and women's teams, the club maintains water polo teams for girls and boys aged 9 and upwards, and participates in all relevant youth competitions.  All teams train under the supervision of head coaches (2010) Ioannis Giannouris and Alexia Kammenou, both former NOV players.

Notable players

Men
  Georgios Afroudakis
  Christos Afroudakis
  Zachos Afroudakis 
  Nikos Darras 
  Ioannis Giannouris
  Theodoros Lorantos
  Dimitrios Mazis 
  George Mavrotas 
  Georgios Psykhos
  Georgios Reppas
  Vangelis Roupakas
  Stefanos Santa
  Konstantinos Tsalkanis
  Anthony Hrysanthos
  Petar Trbojević

Women
  Rebecca Rippon
  Alexandra Asimaki
  Alexia Kammenou
  Angeliki Gerolymou
  Kelina Kantzou
  Dina Kouteli
  Georgia Lara
  Kyriaki Liosi
  Antiopi Melidoni
  Evangelia Moraitidou 
  Anthoula Mylonaki
  Aikaterini Oikonomopoulou
  Antigoni Roumpesi
  Christina Tsoukala
  Patricia del Soto
  Heather Petri
  Moriah van Norman
  Ashleigh Johnson

Notable coaches

Men
  Ioannis Giannouris
  Theodoros Lorantos
  Dimitris Mavrotas 
  Vangelis Roupakas
  Josep Brasco Cata

Women
  Alexia Kammenou
  Giorgos Katsoulis
  Vangelis Roupakas
  Akis Tsatalios

Water polo titles 
Men:
Greek water polo championships (4): 1991, 1997, 1998, 2012
Greek water polo cups (4): 1996, 1999, 2012, 2017
Double (1): 2012
Greek Super Cup (1): 1996
  LEN Cup Winners' Cup (1): 1997
  LEN Euro Cup 
Runners-up (1): 2004
Women:
Greek water polo championships (11) (record): 1991, 1993, 1994, 1997, 2003, 2005, 2006, 2007, 2010, 2012
  Women's LEN Champions' Cup (2): 2009, 2010
Runners-up (3): 2008, 2012, 2014
  Women's LEN Trophy (1): 2003
Runners-up (3): 2000, 2005, 2016
  LEN Women's Supercup (2): 2009, 2010

European Honours

References

External links
Official website 
The photographic archive of NOV, tracking the club's course from the 1940s to the present (in English and Greek)
"La regina Alexia" - news item from the Water Polo Development World website (in Italian and English)

 
Water polo clubs in Greece
Yacht clubs in Greece
1937 establishments in Greece
Multi-sport clubs in Athens
Sports clubs established in 1937
Vari-Voula-Vouliagmeni